Ennio Filonardi (1466–1549) was an Italian bishop and Cardinal. He was born in Bauco, present-day Boville Ernica.

As bishop of Veroli, from 1503 to 1538, he left an architectural mark on the cathedral. In 1538 he was bishop of Montefeltro; on 25 April 1549 he resigned as Bishop of Montefeltro in favor of his nephew Ennio Massari Filonardi.

From the time of his status as close advisor to Pope Innocent VIII, he became one of the salient figures of the papal court. He acted as papal nuncio to Switzerland. He became Bishop of Albano in 1546.

He died during the conclave that elected Pope Julius III, having himself been considered papabile.  This is quite unlikely, since Filonardi was already eighty-three years old;  he was not on any list of papabili provided by any of the Crowns; and he received not a single vote from the first ballot on 4 December to the day of  his death on 19 December 1549.

Notes and references

External links
www.catholic-hierarchy.org
 www.menteantica.it
 www.verbanensia.org

1466 births
1549 deaths
People from the Province of Frosinone
16th-century Italian cardinals
Bishops in Lazio
Cardinal-bishops of Albano
16th-century Italian Roman Catholic bishops